Assura PLC is a British-based property business headquartered in Warrington. It designs, builds, invests in and manages General Practitioner ('GP') and primary care buildings in the UK. It is listed on the London Stock Exchange and is a constituent of the FTSE 250 Index.

History
The business was launched as The Medical Property Investment Fund in 2003 and became listed on the London Stock Exchange in that year. The name was changed to Assura Group in 2006. In 2008 the company bought new premises for expansion in Halton. Assura sold its Assura Medical division to Virgin Group in 2010, which rebranded it as Virgin Care.

It acquired AH Medical, another primary healthcare business, in 2011. It named Graham Roberts, a former finance director of British Land Company, as Chief Executive in March 2012. In June 2012 it decided to convert to Real Estate Investment Trust ('REIT') status.

In July 2016, the firm announced that Roberts had died of cancer. Financial Director Jonathan Murphy became interim CEO and was confirmed in the position permanently in February 2017.

At the beginning of 2021 the business acquired Apollo Capital Projects, increasing its pipeline by an initial eight schemes and expanding the company's offering to the NHS.

Operations
The business invests in and develops primary care buildings in the UK. As of March 2019, the company's portfolio stood at 563 primary care medical centres.

As an NHS partner the company accommodates NHS services within communities. Including, general practice, diagnostic and treatment services (including x-ray), renal dialysis, MSK physiotherapy, dentistry, acute consultant clinics and other community and social prescribing services.

References

External links
Official site

Property companies of the United Kingdom
Companies based in Warrington
Real estate companies established in 2003
2003 establishments in England
Companies listed on the London Stock Exchange